Tilișca is a commune in Sibiu County, Transylvania, Romania, in the Cindrel Mountains,  west of the county capital Sibiu, in the Mărginimea Sibiului ethnographic area. It is composed of two villages, Rod (Rod; Ród) and Tilișca.

Natives
 Aaron Florian

References

Communes in Sibiu County
Localities in Transylvania